Jayson is a masculine given name. Notable people with the name include:

A 
Jayson Adair (born 1969/1970), American businessman
Jayson P. Ahern, American civil servant
Jayson Aquino (born 1992), Dominican baseball player

B 
Jayson Biacan (born 1979), American corporate gangsta
Jayson Blair (actor) (born 1984), American actor
Jayson Breitenbach (born 1998), German footballer
Jayson Bukuya (born 1989), Fijian rugby league player

C 
Jayson Castro (born 1986), Filipino basketball player

D 
Jayson Daniels (born 1971), Australian rules footballer
Jayson Dénommée (born 1977), Canadian figure skater
Jayson DiManche (born 1990), Haitian-American football player
Jayson Durocher (born 1974), American baseball player

F 
Jayson Foster (born 1985), American football player

G 
Jayson Gaignard, Canadian entrepreneur
Jayson Gee (born 1965), American basketball coach
Jayson Gillham (born 1986), Australian pianist
Jayson Gonzales (born 1969), Filipino chess grandmaster
Jayson Granger (born 1989), Uruguayan basketball player
Jayson Greene (born 1981/1982), American author

H 
Jayson Hale (born 1985), American snowboarder
Jayson Hinder (1965–2017), Australian lawyer and politician

J 
Jayson Jablonsky (born 1985), American volleyball player
Jayson Jones (born 1977), German-Belizean runner

K 
Jayson Keeling (born 1966), American artist
Jayson King, American baseball coach

L 
Jayson Leutwiler (born 1989), Swiss footballer
Jayson Lilley (born 1972), British artist
Jayson Love, American entertainer
Jayson Lusk (born 1974), American economist

M 
Jayson Megna (born 1990), American ice hockey player
Jayson Mena (born 1992), Chilean footballer
Jayson Molumby (born 1999), Irish footballer
Jayson More (born 1969), Canadian ice hockey player
Jayson Musson (born 1977), American artist

N 
Jayson Nix (born 1982), American baseball player

O 
Jayson Obazuaye (born 1984), Nigerian basketball player

P 
Jayson Palmgren (born 1989), American football player
Jayson Papeau (born 1996), French footballer
Jayson Patino (born 1983), American Jiu Jitsu practitioner
Jayson Potroz (born 1991), New Zealand rugby union footballer

R 
Jayson Rego, American rugby league footballer

S 
Jayson Shaw (born 1988), Scottish pool player
Jayson Sherlock (born 1970), Australian drummer
Jayson Warner Smith (born 1985), American actor
Jayson Stanley (born 1997), American football player
Jayson Stark (born 1951), American sportswriter
Jayson Swain (born 1984), American football player

T 
Jayson Tatum (born 1998), American basketball player
Jayson Terdiman (born 1988), American luger
Jayson Thiessen (born 1976), Canadian animator
Jayson Timatua (born 1998), Vanuatuan footballer
Jayson Trommel (born 1982), Dutch footballer

U 
Jayson Uribe (born 1999), American motorcycle racer

V 
Jayson Vélez (born 1988), Puerto Rican boxer

W 
Jayson Wells (born 1976), American basketball player
Jayson Werth (born 1979), American baseball player
Jayson Williams (born 1968), American basketball player

See also
Jason (given name), people with the given name "Jason"

Masculine given names
English masculine given names